The Mayor of Bengaluru is the first citizen of the Indian city of Bengaluru. The Mayor is the Chief of Bruhat Bengaluru Mahanagara Palike. The role of Mayor is largely ceremonial. The Mayor also plays a functional role in deliberating over the discussions in the Corporation. The term of the Mayor is set for 5 years as per the Bruhat Bengaluru Mahanagara Palike Act of 2020, during the erstwhile act of Karnataka Municipal Corporations Act of 1976 the term was fixed for 1 year.

Mayors 

 R. Subbanna (1949) - 1st Mayor
 N. Keshavaiengar (1950)
 R. Anantharaman (1951)
 P. Hanumanthiah (1953)
 V.P. Deenadayalu Naidu (1955)
 M. Krishnappa (1956) 
 B. Indiramma
 Dr.M.G.Seshadri
 V. S. Krishna Iyer (1962–63)
 G.Narayana (1964)
 Dr.M.G.Seshadri
 B S Sudhanwa 
 J Kuppuswamy
 BKM Gowda (1985)
 Padmavati Gangadhara Gowda
 G.Kuppaswamy (1994-1995)
 Prema Cariappa 
 P R Ramesh
 J Hucchappa
 K H N Simha
 Putte Gowda 
 M Ramachandrappa 
 Pradeep Reddy
Jeenabhai Devidos
 K.Chandrashekar - 39th Mayor 
 C M Nagaraj (2002-2003)  
 Narayanaswamy - 42nd Mayor 
 Mumtaz Begum - 43rd Mayor
 S K Nataraj - 44th Mayor
 Sharadamma Ramanjaneya - 45th Mayor.
 D. Venkatesh Murthy - 46th Mayor
 B S Satyanarayana alias Katte Satya - 47th Mayor
 N. Shanthakumari - 48th Mayor 
 Manjunath Reddy 49th Mayor
 G. Padmavathi - 50th Mayor
 R. Sampath Raj - 51st Mayor
 Gangambike Mallikarjun - 52nd Mayor
 M Goutham Kumar - 53rd Mayor

References 

 
Bangalore